Jalal al-Din al-Suyuti ( 1445–1505 CE), or Al-Suyuti, was an Egyptian Sunni ascetic polymath. Considered the Mujtahid and Mujaddid of the Islamic 10th century. Foremost leading muhaddith, (hadith master) mufassir (Qu'ran exegete), faqīh (jurist), usuli (legal theorist), grammarian, linguist, rhetorician, historian and philologist, who authored works in virtually every Islamic science.

He was described as one of the most prolific writers of the Middle Ages. Al-Suyuti wrote approximately one thousand works. His biographical dictionary Bughyat al-Wuʻāh fī Ṭabaqāt al-Lughawīyīn wa-al-Nuḥāh contains valuable accounts of prominent figures in the early development of Arabic philology. He was also an important authority of the Shafi'i school of thought (madhhab).

Biography

Early Life
Al-Suyuti was born on 3 October 1445 AD (1 Rajab 849 AH) in Cairo, Egypt.  He hailed from a Persian family on his paternal side. His mother was Circassian. According to al-Suyuti his ancestors came from al-Khudayriyya in Baghdad. His family moved to Asyut in Mamluk Egypt, hence the nisba "Al-Suyuti". His father taught Shafi'i law at the Mosque and Khanqah of Shaykhu in Cairo, but died when al-Suyuti was 5 or 6 years old.

Education

Al-Suyuti grew up in an orphanage in Cairo. He became a Ḥāfiẓ of the Qu'ran at the age of eight years, followed by studying the Shafi'i and Hanafi jurisprudence (fiqh), traditions (hadith), exegesis (tafsir), theology, history, rhetoric, philosophy, philology, arithmetic, timekeeping (miqat) and medicine.

He then dedicated his entire life to master the Sacred Sciences under approximately 150 sheikhs. Among them were renowned scholars who were the leading scholars of each sacred Islamic science of their time.

 Shaykh al-Islam Al-Kamal ibn al-Humam, a leading Hanafi faqih and polymath of his era.
 Shaykh al-Islam Siraj al-Din Omar al-Balqini, a leading Shafi'i faqih of his era and the son of the highly celebrated scholar, Siraj al-Din al-Bulqini.
 Shaykh al-Islam  Sharaf al-Din Al-Munawi, a renowned muhaddith (whose great-grandson 'Abd al-Ra'uf al-Munawi would write a famous commentary on Al-Suyuti's Al-Jami' as-Saghir).
 Taqi al-Din al-Shamani, a hadith expert and a leading professor of the Arabic sciences.
 Jalal al-Din Al-Mahalli, a leading mufassir and a leading specialist in the principles of the law of his time who authored along with Al-Suyuti, one of the most famous tafsirs entitled Tafsir al-Jalalayn.
 Shams al-Din Al-Sakhawi, a leading muhaddith of his era and foremost student of Ibn Hajar Al-Asqalani
 Shihab al-Din As-Sharmisahi, a famous Hanafi scholar of his time.
 Sayf al-Din Qasim ibn Qatlubagha, a famous Hadith master of his time. 
 Muhyi al-Din Al-Kafayji

In his thirst for quest for knowledge, Al-Suyuti travelled to Syria, Hejaz (Mecca & Medina), Yemen, Iraq, India, Tunisia, Morocco, and Mali as well as to educational hubs in Egypt such as Mahalla, Dumyat, and Fayyum.

Teaching
He started teaching Shafi'i jurisprudence at the age of 18, at the same mosque as his father did.

Al-Suyuti became the head master of Hadith at the Shaykhuniyya school in Cairo, at the suggestion of Imam Kamal al-Din ibn al-Humam. In 1486, Sultan Qaitbay appointed him shaykh at the Khanqah of Baybars II, a Sufi lodge, but was sacked due to protests from other scholars whom he had replaced. After this incident, he gave up teaching and was fed up of others being jealous of him.

Avoiding Public Life
In his late forties, al-Suyuti began avoiding the public when he argued with the Sufis in the Baybarsiyyah lodge, he disagreed their claim to be Sufis and were not following the path of saints in terms of manners and ethics, he was thus dismissed.

Ibn Iyas, in his book called Tarikh Misr, said that when al-Suyuti became forty years of age, he left the company of men for the solitude of the garden of al-Miqyas, close to the River Nile, where he abandoned his friends and former co-workers as if he had never met them before. It was at this stage of his life where he authored most of his 600 books and treatises. 

Rich and Influential Muslims and rulers would visit him with large sums of money and gifts but he rejected their offers and also refused the king many times when he ordered al-Suyuti’s to be summoned. He once said to the king's ambassador:

Known incidents
Al-Suyuti had some backlash with some of his contemporaries especially by his own teacher Al-Sakhawi and his fellow student Al-Qastallani who were two major renowned muhaddithuns. Al-Suyuti was accused in a similar reason like Ibn Al-Jawzi but those accusations were later dropped.

Defending Ibn Arabi
His most famous clash was with one of his teachers, Burhan al-Din Ibrahim ibn Umar al-Biqai, who staunchly criticized Ibn Arabi in his book called Tallanbih al-Ghabi ila Takfir Ibn ‘Arabi translated in English 'Warning to the Dolt That Ibn Arabi is an Apostate', Al-Suyuti responded with a book called Tanbih Al-Ghabi fi Takhti'a Ibn ‘Arabi translated in English 'Warning to the Dolt That Faults Ibn ‘Arabi'. Both epistles have been made widely available. In his writing, Al-Suyuti presented that he considered Ibn ‘Arabi a Wali (Friend of Allah) whose books are prohibited to those who read them without first learning the sophisticated terms used by the Sufis. He quotes from Ibn Hajar's list in his book called Anba' al-Gh which mention the trustworthy and respected scholars who kept a positive opinion of Ibn Arabi or even recognized him to be an Awliyah.

Creed & Spiritual Lineage
In terms of his theological positions, Al-Suyuti had a contempt feeling towards the science of speculative theology (kalam) and pushed for strict submission (tafwid). He firmly opposed the use of logic in the Islamic sciences.

Al-Suyuti was Ash'ari in his creed, as presented in many of his works. In Masalik al-Hunafa fi Walidayy al-Mustafa, translated in English 'Methods Of Those With Pure Belief Concerning the Parents of The Prophet ﷺ' he said:

Al-Suyuti claimed to be a mujtahid (an authority on source interpretation who gives legal statements on jurisprudence, hadith studies, and Arabic language).

Al-Suyuti claimed he reached the same level as the major Imams of Hadith and Fiqh.

Al-Suyuti also claimed there was no scholar on Earth more knowledgeable than him:

This brought huge attention and heavy criticism by scholars of his contemporaries as he was portrayed by them as an arrogant scholar who viewed himself to be superior and wiser than others. However, Al-Suyuti defended himself stating he was only speaking the truth so that people can benefit from his vast knowledge and accept his rulings (fatwas).

Al-Suyuti was a Sufi of the Shadhili order. Al-Suyuti’s chain in Tasawwuf goes way back to Sheikh Abdul Qadir Gilani. Al-Suyuti defended Sufis in his book entitled Tashyid al-Haqiqa al-Aliyya:

In his book entitled Tashyid, Al-Suyuti demonstrates a narrative chains of transmission by providing evidence that Hasan al-Basri did in indeed receive narrations directly from Ali ibn Abi Talib. This goes against the mainstream view amongst scholars of Hadith, despite also being a respected opinion of Ahmad Bin Hanbal.

Death
Considered the greatest scholar of his century, he continued publishing books of his scholarly writings until he passed away on 18 October 1505 at the age of sixty two.

In the beginning of his book called 'Al-Riyad al-Aniqa' translated in English 'The names of the Prophet' ﷺ He said:

Reception
Ibn al-ʿImād writes: "Most of his works become world famous in his lifetime." Renowned as a prolific writer, his student Dawudi said: "I was with the Shaykh Suyuti once, and he wrote three volumes on that day. He could dictate annotations on ĥadīth, and answer my objections at the same time. In his time he was the foremost scholar of the ĥadīth and associated sciences, of the narrators including the uncommon ones, the hadith matn (text), isnad (chain of narrators), the derivation of hadith rulings. He has himself told me, that he had memorized over two hundred thousand (200,000) hadiths." Adding that there was no scholar at his time who memorized this much.

His admirers stated that Al-Suyuti writings reached as far as India during his time on Earth. His learning and more importantly his incredible prolific output were widely seen as miraculous signs from God due to his merit.

Works 
The Dalil Makhtutat al-Suyuti ("Directory of al-Suyuti's Manuscripts") states that al-Suyuti wrote works on over 700 subjects, while a 1995 survey put the figure between 500 and 981. However, these include short pamphlets, and legal opinions.

He wrote his first book, Sharh Al-Isti'aadha wal-Basmalah, in 866 AH, at the age of seventeen.

In Ḥusn al-Muḥaḍarah al-Suyuti lists 283 of his works on subjects from religion to medicine. As with Abu'l-Faraj ibn al-Jawzi in his medicinal works, he writes almost exclusively on prophetic medicine, rather than the Islamic-Greek synthesis of medicinal tradition found in the works of Al-Dhahabi. He focuses on diet and natural remedies for serious ailments such as rabies and smallpox, and for simple conditions such as headaches and nosebleeds, and mentions the cosmology behind the principles of medical ethics.

Al-Suyuti also wrote a number of Islamic sexual education manuscripts that represent major works in the genre, which began in the 10th-century in Baghdad. The most significant of these works is Al-Wishāḥ fī Fawāʾid al-Nikāḥ ("The Sash on the Merits of Wedlock"), but other examples of such manuscripts include Shaqāʾiq al-Utrunj fī Raqāʾiq al-Ghunj, Nawāḍir al-Ayk fī Maʻrifat al-Nayk and Nuzhat al-Mutaʾammil.

Major works

Tafsir al-Jalalayn; a Qur'anic exegesis written by Al-Suyuti and his teacher Jalal al-Din al-Mahalli
Dur al-Manthur a famous and authoritative narration based tafsir.
 Al-Itqān fi ‘Ulum Al-Qur’an (translated into English as The Perfect Guide to the Sciences of the Qur'an)
Al-Tibb al Nabawi
Al-Jaami' al-Kabir
Al-Jaami' al-Saghir
Sharh Sunan An-Nasaai, a famous commentary of Sunan al-Nasa'i
Annotations Sunan Abi Dawood, a complete annotations of Sunan Abu Dawood written by the Hadith scientist Al-Suyuti
Alfiyyah al-Hadith 
Tadrib al-Rawi both in hadith terminology
Al-Ashbaahu Wan-Nadhaair, a famous authoritative book of the Shafi'i madhab
History of the Caliphs
The Khalifas who Took the Right Way, a partial translation of the History of the Caliphs, covering the first four Rashidun caliphs and Hasan ibn Ali
Tabaqat al-Huffaz, an appendix to al-Dhahabi's Tadhkirat al-huffaz
Nuzhat al-Julasāʼ fī Ashʻār al-Nisāʼ, "An Anthology of Women's Verse'
Al-Khasais-ul-Kubra, which discusses the miracles of Islamic prophet Muhammad
 (Arabic Linguistics)
Uqud Al Juman (Arabic Rhetoric)
Al-Faridah (Arabic Grammar)
The Book of Exposition (credited)

See also 
 List of Ash'aris and Maturidis
 List of Sufis

Notes

References

Sources

External links 

 Tafsir al-Jalalayn Commentary on the Quran (in English).
 Radiant Cosmography (al Haya al-saniya fi al-haya al-sunniya) in English at archive.org.
 The Dead become Alive by the Grace of the Holy Five (Ihyya al-mayyit) in English at archive.org.

Asharis
Shafi'is
Sunni Sufis
Shaykh al-Islāms
Mujaddid
15th-century Egyptian historians
Egyptian imams
Egyptian people of Iranian descent
Egyptian people of Circassian descent
Egyptian scientists
Egyptian Sunni Muslims
Egyptian Sufis
Egyptian theologians
Hadith scholars
Scholars from the Mamluk Sultanate
Encyclopedists of the medieval Islamic world
Medieval Egyptian scientists
Quranic exegesis scholars
Sunni Muslim scholars of Islam
Sunni imams
Shafi'i fiqh scholars
Sufi mystics
16th-century jurists
15th-century biographers
15th-century jurists
15th-century scientists
1445 births
1505 deaths
Biographical evaluation scholars
Supporters of Ibn Arabi
Circassian Mamluks
16th-century Egyptian historians
Muslim scholars of Islamic jurisprudence